David Dodds may refer to:
David Dodds (cricketer) (born 1981), English cricketer
David John Dodds (born 1930), marathoner and jockey
Davie Dodds (born 1958), Scottish footballer
David J. Dodds (1952–1987), American aviator and the first officer of Northwest Airlines Flight 255

See also
David Dodd (disambiguation)